Zamodes obscurus is a species of beetle in the family Cerambycidae, the only species in the genus Zamodes, described by John Lawrence LeConte in 1873 from a single specimen collected in Pennsylvania, currently stored at the Museum of Comparative Zoology, Harvard University, which remains the only specimen in existence, and the species is presumed to be extinct. It belongs to the tribe Hesperophanini.

Description 
Original description from LeConte, 1873:

References

External links 
https://www.gbif.org/occurrence/911755371

Hesperophanini
Extinct insects since 1500
Extinct animals of the United States
Beetles described in 1873
Monotypic beetle genera

Extinct insect genera